DSS is a baseball and softball club based in Haarlem, the Netherlands. The 2,500 capacity Pim Mulier Stadium is their home venue.

Since 2020 DSS has fielded a combined team with fellow Haarlem baseball club Kinheim. Kinheim was unable to qualify for the Hoofdklasse after being relegated in 2019, and DSS was unable to participate in the top league due to financial difficulties. The fusion enabled the combined clubs to continue fielding a team from Haarlem in the Hoofdklasse.

References

External links
Official DSS site

Sports clubs in Haarlem
Baseball teams in the Netherlands
Softball teams in the Netherlands